FITkit is a hardware platform used for educational purposes at the Brno University of Technology in the Czech Republic.

FITkit
The FITkit contains a low-power microcontroller, a field programmable gate array chip (FPGA) and a set of peripherals.
Utilizing advanced reconfigurable hardware, the FITkit may be modified to suit various tasks.

Configuration of the FPGA chip can be specified using the VHDL hardware description language (i.e. VHSIC hardware description language).

Software for the Microcontroller is written in C and compiled using the GNU Compiler Collection.
Configuration of the FPGA chip is synthesized from the source VHDL code using professional design tools, which are also available free of charge.

Use in education
The FITkit serves as an educational tool in several courses throughout the bachelor's and master's degree programmes. Students are expected to create an FPGA interpreter design of a simple programming language (such as Brainfuck) as part of the Design of Computer Systems course.

Licensing
The project is developed as an open-source (software) and open-core (hardware), under the BSD license.

Related projects
 QDevKit, multiplatform development environment for FITkit (Linux, BSD and Microsoft Windows operating systems)

References

External links
 Official website
 FITkit team
 Faculty of Information Technology (Brno University of Technology)
 Design of Computer Systems course website

Embedded systems
Software using the BSD license